This list of tallest buildings in Hobart ranks the tallest in the Australian city of Hobart by height. This ranking system, created by the US-based Council on Tall Buildings and Urban Habitat includes the height to a spire but not to an antenna. It also stands as the tallest building in the state of Tasmania.

To maintain the city's identity with the nearby Derwent River and Mount Wellington Hobart currently has a range of height limits depending on the location with a  height being the maximum allowable height. There are several buildings above this height that were constructed prior to the current height restrictions and the Hobart City Council has made exceptions to certain develops if it is found that the development in question would benefit the city.

The tallest buildings in Tasmania outside Hobart include the Shot Tower, Taroona (58m) and the Silos Hotel in Launceston (either 46m or 35m.)

Major future projects

This is a list of the tallest buildings under construction, approved or proposed in Hobart.

The proposed hotel at MONA is within the planning boundaries of the Glenorchy City Council and will therefor height restrictions are not expected to be as strict. If approved, the hotel will be one of the tallest buildings in Tasmania.

If completed, 145 Liverpool Street would be one of the largest office buildings within Hobart. However, due to difficulty attracting tenants the future of this development is uncertain.

See also

List of tallest buildings in Australia
List of tallest buildings in Oceania

References

Buildings and structures in Hobart
Hobart
Hobart
Hobart, tallest buildings
Tallest in Hobart